In topology, a branch of mathematics, Borel's theorem, due to , says the cohomology ring of a classifying space or a classifying stack is a polynomial ring.

See also 
Atiyah–Bott formula

Notes

References 

Theorems in algebraic topology
Theorems in algebraic geometry